St. Michael High School is a private, Roman Catholic high school in Shenandoah, a census-designated place in unincorporated East Baton Rouge Parish, Louisiana, United States, east of the city of Baton Rouge. It is located in the Roman Catholic Diocese of Baton Rouge.

It is in the proposed City of St. George.

Background
Established in 1984 by the Catholic Diocese of Baton Rouge, St. Michael the Archangel Diocesan Regional High School is located in the South Central Deanery on 63 lush acres in White Oak Subdivision, and is surrounded by protected wetlands under the auspices of the school. Staffed by a dedicated faculty of religious laymen and women, the school is fully accredited by the Louisiana State Board of Elementary & Secondary education and by the Southern Association of Colleges and Schools. Operational guidelines are based on the administrator’s handbook for the State of Louisiana.

Athletics 
St. Michael the Archangel High athletics competes in the LHSAA.

Championships
Boys Cross Country- 2007 - 2008 4A State Champions
Girls Basketball- 2007-2008 4A State Champions
Girls Cross Country- 2007-2008 4A State Champions
Wrestling 2009-2010 Division II State Champions

Notable alumni
 Jacob Evans, NBA Shooting Guard - Golden State Warriors
 Carley Ann McCord, Sports broadcaster and journalist
Julius Warmsley, NFL Defensive End - Seattle Seahawks

Notes and references

External links
 School Website

Catholic secondary schools in Louisiana
Schools in Baton Rouge, Louisiana
Educational institutions established in 1984
1984 establishments in Louisiana